Acianthus caudatus, commonly known as mayfly orchid, is a species of flowering plant in the orchid family Orchidaceae and is endemic to eastern Australia. It is a terrestrial herb with a single egg-shaped or heart-shaped leaf and up to nine dark purplish flowers with thin, spreading sepals and petals, often with a musty odour.

Description
Acianthus caudatus is a terrestrial, perennial, deciduous, sympodial herb with a single thin, egg-shaped to heart-shaped leaf which is dark green on the upper surface and reddish-purple on its lower surface. Flowering occurs from August to October.

Taxonomy and naming
Acianthus caudatus  was first formally described in 1810 by Robert Brown and the description was published in Prodromus Florae Novae Hollandiae et Insulae Van Diemen. The specific epithet (caudatus) is derived from the Latin word cauda meaning "tail".

Distribution and habitat
Mayfly orchid grows among low shrubs in open forest south of the Manning River in New South Wales, through Victoria to the Eyre Peninsula in South Australia. It is also found in Tasmania.

References

External links 
 

caudatus
Orchids of New South Wales
Orchids of Queensland
Orchids of South Australia
Orchids of Tasmania
Orchids of Victoria (Australia)
Endemic orchids of Australia
Plants described in 1810
Taxa named by Robert Brown (botanist, born 1773)